Pammenopsis is a genus of moths belonging to the family Tortricidae.

Species
Pammenopsis barbata Komai & Horak, in Horak, 2006
Pammenopsis critica (Meyrick, 1905)

See also
List of Tortricidae genera

References

External links
tortricidae.com

Tortricidae genera
Olethreutinae